Spence Harbor is a small bay 1 nautical mile (1.9 km) south of The Turret, along the east coast of Coronation Island, in the South Orkney Islands. Discovered in December 1821 by Captain George Powell, a British sealer in the sloop Dove, who named the bay, and Captain Nathaniel Palmer, an American sealer in the sloop James Monroe.

Bays of the South Orkney Islands